The Battle of Buxar was fought between 22 and 23 October 1764, between the forces under the command of the British East India Company, led by Hector Munro, and the combined armies of Mir Qasim, Nawab of Bengal till 1764; the Nawab of Awadh, Shuja-ud-Daula; and the Mughal Emperor, Shah Alam II. The war was brought to an end by the Treaty of Allahabad in 1765.

Battle
The British army engaged in the fighting numbered 17,072 comprising 1,859 British regulars, 5,297 Indian sepoys and 9,189 Indian cavalry. The alliance army's numbers were estimated to be over 40,000. According to other sources, the combined army of the Mughals, Awadh and Mir Qasim consisting of 10
,000 men was defeated by a British army comprising 10,000 men. The Nawabs had gained their military power after the battle of Buxar.

The lack of basic co-ordination among the major three disparate allies was responsible for their decisive defeat.

Mirza Najaf Khan commanded the right flank of the Mughal imperial army and was the first to advance his forces against Major Hector Munro at daybreak; the British lines formed within twenty minutes and reversed the advance of the Mughals. According to the British, Durrani and Rohilla cavalry were also present and fought during the battle in various skirmishes. But by midday, the battle was over and Shuja-ud-Daula blew up large tumbrils and three massive magazines of gunpowder.

Munro divided his army into various columns and particularly pursued the Mughal Grand Vizier Shuja-ud-Daula the Nawab of Awadh who responded by blowing up his boat-bridge after crossing the river, thus abandoning the Mughal Emperor Shah Alam II and members of his own regiment. Mir Qasim also fled with his 3 million rupees worth of gemstones and later died in poverty in 1777. Mirza Najaf Khan reorganised formations around Shah Alam II, who retreated and then chose to negotiate with the victorious British.

Historian John William Fortescue claimed that the British casualties totalled 847: 39 killed and 64 wounded from the European regiments and 250 killed, 435 wounded and 85 missing from the East India Company's sepoys. He also claimed that the three Indian allies suffered 2,000 dead and that many more were wounded. Another source says that there were 69 European and 664 sepoy casualties on the British side and 6,000 casualties on the Mughal side. The victors captured 133 pieces of artillery and over 1 million rupees of cash. Immediately after the battle, Munro decided to assist the Marathas, who were described as a "warlike race", well known for their relentless and unwavering hatred towards the Mughal Empire and its Nawabs and Mysore.

Aftermath
The British victory at Buxar had "at one fell swoop", disposed of the three main scions of Mughal power in Upper India. Mir Qasim disappeared into impoverished obscurity. Shah Alam II surrendered himself to the British, and Shah Shuja[Shuja-ud-Daula] fled west hotly pursued by the victors. The whole Ganges valley lay at the company's mercy; Shah Shuja eventually surrendered;  By 1765, the British had become the virtual rulers of Bengal, Bihar and Orissa. Robert Clive became the first governor of Bengal.

Gallery

See also
 Battle of Plassey

References

External links
 A detailed description of the Battle of Buxar

British East India Company
Battles involving the Mughal Empire
Battles involving the Indian kingdoms
Battles involving Bengal
Battles involving the British East India Company
1764 in India
Conflicts in 1764
History of Bihar
1764 in the Mughal Empire